Djibril Dianessy (born 29 March 1996) is a French professional footballer who plays as a winger for Nõmme Kalju.

Club career
On 17 June 2021, Dianessy joined Ligue 2 club Pau. On 6 January 2022, he suffered an anterior cruciate ligament injury, which made him absent for the remainder of the 2021–22 season. In July 2022, Pau decided to terminate his contract.

Personal life
Dianessy is of Malian descent.

References

External links
 Voetbal International profile 

1996 births
Living people
People from Villemomble
Footballers from Seine-Saint-Denis
Association football wingers
French footballers
French people of Malian descent
Toulouse FC players
Fortuna Sittard players
MVV Maastricht players
Pau FC players
Nõmme Kalju FC players
Championnat National 3 players
Eerste Divisie players
Eredivisie players
Ligue 2 players

French expatriate footballers
Expatriate footballers in the Netherlands
French expatriate sportspeople in the Netherlands
Expatriate footballers in Estonia
French expatriate sportspeople in Estonia